Emphytopsis is a genus of sawflies in the family Tenthredinidae.

Species
 Emphytopsis flatoserrula Wei, 2011
 Emphytopsis lii Wei, 2011
 Emphytopsis nigricornis Wei & Xu, 2011
 Emphytopsis nigromaculata (Takeuchi, 1952)
 Emphytopsis punctata Wei & Nie, 1998
 Emphytopsis quadrata Wei & Xu, 2011
 Emphytopsis shinoharai Wei & Niu, 2011
 Emphytopsis unimaculata Wei, 2011
 Emphytopsis zhongi Wei & Niu, 2011

References

Tenthredinidae